Domboshaba  ruins is a cultural and heritage site in Botswana originally occupied towards the end of the Great Zimbabwe period (1250–1450 AD). The site is a respected place for the people living in the region and it is believed that the chief lived on the top of the hill together with his helpers or assistants.

The phrase Dombo means hill and the word Shaba means red (translated from the Ikalanga language means "red" or eland Hill). Domboshaba is also called the Luswingo used to be the settlement of the Great chief of that time. The ruins are similar to the Mwenemotapa. The chief's wife settled below the hill. Domboshaba has other ranges of hills along it, a natural water well located in Mantenge hill, called Mantenge Well which never dries up: the well is 7 metres deep and is situated in the rock.

Cultural Heritage 

Domboshaba is an open site of more than 8 hectares. On the hilltop there are dry stone walls which form private enclosures. Most of these stone walls have an average height of 1.8 metres. The stone wall structures are mostly free standing with a few platforms which mainly form part of the entrances. There are 15 visible dakha floors representing the presence of huts. The site has been revered by local people and has been protected by local taboos until the advent of colonialism, from that point onwards there was a lot of treasure hunting, the site was excavated by treasure hunters and archaeologists.

Rules at the site 

Rules
Domboshaba is a national monument administered by the Botswana National Museum and protected by the revised Monuments and Relics Act (2001).

Grinding stone (Milling stone) 
The milling stone was used to grind food-stuffs such as tobacco and groundnuts.

Gallery of Domboshaba

Domboshaba gate house 
The Domboshaba gate house was constructed and opened by the Kalakamati Community through the Ipelegeng programme (Self reliance) in collaboration with the department of national museum and monuments.

The chief's residence 
The dry stone walling is a building method by which structures are constructed from stones without any mortar to bind them together. The hill top was the resident of the chief, his religious advisor and closer attendants. The hilltop has six stone wall enclosures while the lower part has one main enclosure divided into several enclosures where the chief's wives and family lived.

Grinding Stone 
This is a milling stone which was used at Domboshaba to grind tobacco, ground nuts and sorghum. Reaffirming the notion that the site was a very prominent trading centre occupied by Iron Age farmers. Quern stones work in pairs. The lower stationary stone is called the Quern, while the upper mobile is called a hand-stone. The original former stone has been vandalized by unknown persons.

Dakha floors 
There are remains of several dakha floors found at the Domboshaba monument made of soil mixed with cow dung spread across the monument. The older dakha house floors were exposed by amateur archaeologists and soil erosion over time. These floors were made with soils that have high ratio of clay to gravel. It is believed that the house floors were fired to strengthen them for longer periods.

Domboshaba cultural festival 
Domboshaba Cultural festival started in 2000 when Mukani Action Campaign (MAC) and the Balumbidzi be iKalanga (The Society for the Promotion of iKalanga Language (SPIL) embarked on a search for ways to promote and celebrate the culture and history of the Kalanga people. Domboshaba monument hosts an annual festival event at the heritage site every year. The event comprises distinguished guests from different backgrounds to come and witness the culture and tradition of Kalanga people. This event is respected and sponsored by the Botswana tourism organisation to openly create awareness about the event and the monument site, this will also be the time to share Kalanga tradition experience and have a taste of the different traditional foods ranging from Delele, Nyembah, Topii, Morogo wa dinawa, Zengwe, Lebelebele and others. Domboshaba cultural festival does not only attract the audience from the Botswana and Zimbabwe, rather the events done there exposes the culture of Kalanga people.

Festival schedule 
Domboshaba festival is scheduled to take place every year in September 26–28.

Domboshaba cultural trust 
Domboshaba cultural trust or DTC is one of the sponsors of Domboshaba cultural festival and since its formation in the year 2007 it has become an annual event to bring together youth from Kalanga tradition and other groups to learn about the culture and tradition of Kalanga people.

References 

Archaeological sites in Botswana